Codazzi is a surname. Notable people with the surname include:
Agostino Codazzi (1793–1859), Italian military, veteran of Napoleonic Wars, scientist, geographer and cartographer
Delfino Codazzi (1824–1873), Italian mathematician
Niccolò Codazzi (1642–1693), Italian painter
Viviano Codazzi (–1670, Italian painter